Roman Pilipenko also written as Roman Pinipenko (born 24 December 1987) is a water polo player of Kazakhstan. He was part of the Kazakhstani team winning the gold medal at the 2010 Asian Games. He was also part of the team at world championships, including at the 2009, 2011, 2013 and 2015 World Aquatics Championships.

References

Kazakhstani male water polo players
Living people
Place of birth missing (living people)
1987 births
Asian Games medalists in water polo
Water polo players at the 2010 Asian Games
Water polo players at the 2014 Asian Games
Water polo players at the 2018 Asian Games
Asian Games gold medalists for Kazakhstan
Medalists at the 2010 Asian Games
Medalists at the 2014 Asian Games
Medalists at the 2018 Asian Games
21st-century Kazakhstani people